Santa  María de Iquique, cantata popular is a cantata composed in 1969 by the Chilean composer Luis Advis Vitaglich, combining elements of both classical and folkloric/indigenous musical traditions to produce what became known as a popular cantata and one of Quilapayún’s most acclaimed and popular music interpretation. The theme of the cantata is a historical industrial dispute that ended with the massacre of miners in the northern Chilean city of Iquique in 1907. The reading is impeccably executed by the Chilean actor Hector Duvauchelle, who captures the increasingly tense struggle between the miners and their exploiters in the narrative. Instrumental interludes and songs empower the progression of the story leading to a final song which voices the miners demand for an end to exploitation with visions of an egalitarian and free world.

Composer's Notes

The following are the statements made by Luis Advis, that appeared on the original booklet that accompanied the record release in 1970.

“This work, dedicated to Quilapayún, was composed following the general guidelines of a classical cantata. There is, albeit, a variant which refers to: literary-thematic aspects: the traditional religious motive has been replaced with one based on real events from the social order.”

“The musical stylistics: rather than avoid the European traditions, it has been amalgamated with melodic trends, harmonic modulations and rhythmic nuclei of American or Hispanic-American root. “

“Instrumental aspects: of the traditional orchestra we have only preserved the violoncello and the double bass in supporting mode, joined by two guitars, two quenas, one charango and one Bombo legüero. “

“Narrative aspects: the classical recitative chant has been replaced by spoken narration. This contains rhythmic and metrical elements with the aim of not breaking the sonorous totality.”

History

The Cantata Santa Maria de Iquique represented Quilapayun at the Segundo Festival de la Nueva Canción Chilena (NCCh) (Second Festival of the New Chilean Song).

Despite the success of the work, it had its share of critics within the music world at the time of its release; some critics saw this work as too pretentious, complex and classical for it to be part of a popular neo-folkloric movement. This debate over what was authentic, what served “the cause” would grow in the years following the cantata’s release – creating serious dialectical confrontations on what materials were to be included or excluded from the NCCh.

Despite this the work was the highlight of the NCCh and a masterpiece of the Nueva Canción in Latin America and many musicologists and musicians consider it one of the most important recorded musical composition in Latin American music history.

This great appreciation for the work didn’t appear to be shared by some members of Quilapayun who saw in the existing work considerable room for improvement. In 1978, they assigned the Belgian/Argentine writer Julio Cortázar to restructure part of the original text and they introduced minor modifications to the original recorded arrangements for a new version and recording. This was done without consulting the composer of the work, Luis Advis, who upon hearing of the recording expressed great dismay and publicly attacked the artistic integrity of both Quilapayun and Julio Cortázar.

Song listing
”Pregón” / Announcement  (Solo vocal: Eduardo Carrasco) – 2:11
”Preludio instrumental” / Instrumental Prelude – 5:45
”Relato I” / Narrative I (Narration: Héctor Duvauchelle) – 2:11
”Canción I” / Choral Song I  (“El sol en desierto grande…” / The sun in the great desert) – 2:21
”Interludio instrumental I” / Instrumental Interlude I – 1:33
”Relato II” / Narrative II  (Narration: Héctor Duvauchelle) – 1:21
”Canción II” / Solo Song II [“Vamos mujer…” / We must leave woman…] (Solo vocal: Rodolfo Parada) – 2:08
”Interludio instrumental II” / Instrumental Interlude II – 1:44
”Relato III” / Narrative III (Narration: Héctor Duvauchelle) – 1:35
”Interludio cantado” /Sung interlude [“Se han unido con nosotros…” / They’ve joined with us] (solo vocals: Carlos Quezada) – 2:05
”Relato IV” / Narrative IV  (Narration: Héctor Duvauchelle) – 1:00
”Canción III” / Song III  [“Soy obrero pampino…” / I am a pampean worker…] (solo vocals: Willy Oddó) – 1:44
”Interludio instrumental III” / Instrumental Interlude III – 1:55
”Relato V” / Narrative V  (Narration: Héctor Duvauchelle) – 2:14
”Canción letanía” /  Supplicatory song  (“Murieron tres mil seisientos…” / Three thousand six hundred died…)  - 1:33
”Canción IV” / Song IV  [“A los hombres de la Pampa…” / To the men of the Pampa...] (Solo vocals: Eduardo Carrasco) – 2:55
”Pregón II” /  Announcement II (Solo Vocals: Hernán Gómez) – 0:32
”Canción final” / Final Song  (“Ustedes que ya escucharon…” / You, who have now heard…) (Solo vocals: Patricio Castillo) – 2:50

Personnel
Eduardo Carrasco
Rodolfo Parada
Willy Oddó
Carlos Quezada
Patricio Castillo (musician)
Hernán Gomez

Additional Personnel
Héctor Duvauchelle (Narrator)
Eduardo Seinkiewicz (Violoncello)
Luis Bignon (Double bass)

References and other sources
Lasko, Susan. Songs of Struggle, Songs of Hope: The Chilean New Song. Senior Essay (USA, 1977)

External links
Cantata Santa María de Iquique Text/Lyrics
Luis Advis' site

Cantatas
1969 compositions
Compositions with a narrator
Iquique
Saltpeter works in Chile